Clary is a commune of the Nord department in northern France.

Heraldry

World War I
The commune was liberated from German occupation by 5th/6th Battalion, Scottish Rifles, on 9 October 1918. The Place de la Mairie was renamed Place des Ecossais in their honour. When King George V visited Clary in November 1918, the same battalion was drawn up in the place to welcome him. Among those liberated was a British soldier who had been in hiding since the Battle of Le Cateau in August 1914.

See also
Communes of the Nord department

Notes

References
 Brig-Gen Sir James E. Edmonds & Lt-Col R. Maxwell-Hyslop, History of the Great War: Military Operations, France and Belgium 1918, Vol V, 26th September–11th November, The Advance to Victory, London: HM Stationery Office, 1947/Imperial War Museum and Battery Press, 1993, .
 Lt-Col Graham Seton-Hutchinson, The Thirty-Third Division in France and Flanders, 1915–1919, London: Waterlow & Sons 1921/Uckfield: Naval & Military Press, 2004, .

Communes of Nord (French department)
Nord communes articles needing translation from French Wikipedia